Hydrazones are a class of organic compounds with the structure . They are related to ketones and aldehydes by the replacement of the oxygen =O with the = functional group. They are formed usually by the action of hydrazine on ketones or aldehydes.

Synthesis
Hydrazine, organohydrazines, and 1,1-diorganohydrazines react with aldehydes and ketones to give hydrazones.

Phenylhydrazine reacts with reducing sugars to form hydrazones known as osazones, which was developed by German chemist Emil Fischer as a test to differentiate monosaccharides.

Uses
Hydrazones are the basis for various analyses of ketones and aldehydes. For example, dinitrophenylhydrazine coated onto a silica sorbent is the basis of an adsorption cartridge. The hydrazones are then eluted and analyzed by HPLC using a UV detector.

The compound carbonyl cyanide-p-trifluoromethoxyphenylhydrazone (abbreviated as FCCP) is used to uncouple ATP synthesis and reduction of oxygen in oxidative phosphorylation in molecular biology.

Hydrazones are the basis of bioconjugation strategies.
Hydrazone-based coupling methods are used in medical biotechnology to couple drugs to targeted antibodies (see ADC), e.g. antibodies against a certain type of cancer cell. The hydrazone-based bond is stable at neutral pH (in the blood), but is rapidly destroyed in the acidic environment of lysosomes of the cell. The drug is thereby released in the cell, where it exerts its function.

Reactions
Hydrazones are susceptible to hydrolysis:
 
Alkyl hydrazones are 102- to 103-fold more sensitive to hydrolysis than analogous oximes.

When derived from hydrazine itself, hydrazones condense with a second equivalent of a carbonyl to give azines:

Hydrazones are intermediates in the Wolff–Kishner reduction.

Hydrazones are reactants in hydrazone iodination, the Shapiro reaction, and the Bamford-Stevens reaction to vinyl compounds. Hydrazones can also be synthesized by the Japp–Klingemann reaction via β-keto-acids or β-keto-esters and aryl diazonium salts. Hydrazones are converted to azines when used in the preparation of 3,5-disubstituted 1H-pyrazoles, a reaction also well known using hydrazine hydrate. With a transition metal catalyst, hydrazones can serve as organometallic reagent surrogates to react with various electrophiles.

N,N-dialkylhydrazones

In N,N-dialkylhydrazones the C=N bond can be hydrolysed, oxidised and reduced, the N–N bond can be reduced to the free amine. The carbon atom of the C=N bond can react with organometallic nucleophiles. The alpha-hydrogen atom is more acidic by 10 orders of magnitude compared to the ketone and therefore more nucleophilic. Deprotonation with for instance LDA gives an azaenolate which can be alkylated by alkyl halides. The hydrazines SAMP and RAMP function as chiral auxiliary.

Gallery

See also
Azo compound
Imine
Nitrosamine
Hydrogenation of carbon–nitrogen double bonds

References

 
Functional groups